Leon Abbott is a former college ice hockey coach who is most remembered for being fired by Boston University six games into the 1973–74 season for violating NCAA eligibility rules.

Career
Abbott began his coaching career after graduating from McGill in 1964. He coached briefly for a small college in Alberta before moving to take an assistant coaching position at St. Lawrence. In 1969 Abbott was offered the top job at Rensselaer, taking over from Garry Kearns, and after a poor first season, returned the Engineers to winning ways with 16- and 17-win seasons, making the ECAC tournament in consecutive seasons.

Abbott received his big break in 1972 when Jack Kelley stepped away from Boston University to pursue a professional coaching career and Abbott was given the job to replace him. The Terriers were coming off back-to-back National Championships and didn't take much of a step backwards with their new bench boss, finishing the season at a 22-6-1 mark, but after the season the NCAA forced BU to forfeit 11 wins due to ineligible players. While that decision meant little in and of itself as the Terriers had already finished their season, the team and Abbott in particular were placed under heightened scrutiny by the NCAA.  Early in the following season, two players (Peter Marzo and Bill Buckton) were ruled to be professional athletes by having accepted money to play amateur hockey, a violation of NCAA regulations. While federal court judge Joseph L. Tauro later reinstated the players, the damage had been done.  After a 4-2 start, Abbott was fired by BU and replaced by his assistant, Jack Parker.

After the season Abbott returned to his undergraduate alma mater, Alberta, and assumed head coaching duties until he was offered a third NCAA job, this time by St. Lawrence. The Saints had been slipping in the standings and were looking for someone to return them to their earlier glory but bringing Abbott back to Canton didn't work out as expected. In three seasons Abbott posted a record of 28-59-2, finishing well out of the conference playoffs each year. Things began to look up at the beginning of his fourth campaign as the Saints won their first three contests, but everything went south after as they dropped eight straight matches. The final straw was a 12-3 trouncing by Clarkson on December 1 after which Abbott stepped down as head coach.

Head coaching record
References: 

^BU forfeited 11 wins after the 1972-73 season due to an ineligible player. Record without forfeits is 22-6-1 (13-4-1 ECAC).

†BU fired Abbott on December 21, 1973. Jack Parker finished the season. BU credits the first six games of the 1973-74 season to Abbott and the remaining 25 games to Parker.

‡Abbott stepped down from his position mid-season

References

External links

RPI Engineers men's ice hockey coaches
Boston University Terriers men's ice hockey coaches
St. Lawrence Saints men's ice hockey coaches
Living people
Year of birth missing (living people)